Pardes (Hebrew:  pardēs, "orchard") is the subject of a Jewish aggadah ("legend") about four rabbis of the Mishnaic period (1st century CE) who visited the pardes (the "orchard" of esoteric Torah knowledge), only one of whom succeeded in leaving the pardes unharmed.

The basic story goes as follows:
Four entered the pardes—Ben Azzai, Ben Zoma, Ben Avuya (called אחר - acher, the another one - because of what happened to him after he entered the pardes) and Rabbi Akiva. One looked and died; one looked and went mad; one looked and apostatized; and one entered in peace and departed in peace.Sources differ with regard to which sage died and which became demented; the Tosefta and Bavli say ben-Azai died and ben-Zoma became demented, but the Yerushalmi, Shir HaShirim Rabbah, and Hekhalot literature record the inverse.

Etymology

The Hebrew word פַּרְדֵּס (pardes, "orchard") is of Persian origin (cf Avestan 𐬞𐬀𐬌𐬭𐬌⸱𐬛𐬀𐬉𐬰𐬀) and appears several times in the Bible. The same Old Persian root is the source of the word paradise via Latin paradisus and Greek παράδεισος, which were used for פרדס's Biblical Hebrew equivalent גן, Garden, in early Bible translations.

Samson Levey proposed the Greek paradosis suggests the four were examining the claims and early documents of Christianity and that the Tosefta account preserves the scholarly undertaking most accurately.

Account
The story is found in several places, with minor variations: the Tosefta, the Babylonian Talmud, and the Jerusalem Talmud. The earliest context, found in the Tosefta, is the restriction on transmitting mystical teaching concerning the divine Chariot except privately to particularly qualified disciples. The version in the Babylonian Talmud, which is the best-known, may be translated:

Versions of the story also appear in the esoteric Hekhalot literature.

Exposition

Rashi says that ben Azzai died from looking at the Divine Presence. Ben Zoma's harm was in losing his sanity. Acher's  "cutting down the plantings" in the orchard refers to becoming a heretic from the experience. Acher means "the other one", and is the Talmudic term for the tanna Elisha ben Abuyah (Yerushalmi identifies him as EbA on the following line; MSS Munich 6 of the Bavli and Hekhalot Zutarti read "Elisha ben Abuyah" in place of "Acher"). Akiva, in contrast to the other three, became the leading Rabbinic figure of the era.

Rashi explains that the four rabbis ascended to Heaven by utilizing the Divine Name, which might be understood as achieving a spiritual elevation through Jewish meditation practices.

The Tosafot, medieval commentaries on the Talmud, say that the four sages "did not go up literally, but it appeared to them as if they went up." On the other hand, Rabbi Louis Ginzberg wrote that the journey to paradise "is to be taken literally and not allegorically".

According to another interpretation, PaRDeS is an acronym for the four traditional methods of exegesis in Judaism. In this sense, they were the four to understand the whole Torah.

Interpretation in Kabbalah
Another version of the legend is also found in the mystical literature (Zohar I, 26b and Tikunei haZohar 40), which adds to the story:

Moses ben Jacob Cordovero explains the Zoharic passage in his Pardes Rimonim ("Orchard of Pomegranates"), whose title itself refers to the Pardes mystical ascent (Pardes: Shaar Arachei HaKinuim, entry on Mayim-Water). The meaning of the ascent is understood through Rabbi Akiva's warning. The danger concerns misinterpreting anthropomorphism in Kabbalah, introducing corporeal notions in the Divine. Emanations in Kabbalah bridge between the Ein Sof Divine Unity and the plurality of Creation. The fundamental mystical error involves separating between divine transcendence and immanence, as if they were a duality. Rather, all Kabbalistic emanations have no being of their own, but are nullified and dependent on their source of vitality in the One God. Nonetheless, Kabbalah maintains that God is revealed through the life of His emanations, Man interacting with Divinity in a mutual Flow of "Direct Light" from Above to Below and "Returning Light" from Below to Above. The Sefirot, including Wisdom, Compassion and Kingship comprise the dynamic life in God's Persona. In the highest of the Four Worlds (Atziluth), the complete nullification and Unity of the sefirot and Creation is revealed within its Divine source. Apparent separation only pertains, in successive degrees, to the lower Three Worlds and our Physical Realm. Introducing false separation causes the exile of the Shekhinah within Creation from God. From Cordovero's explanation:

See also
 Pardes (Jewish exegesis)
 Elisha ben Abuyah
 Olam Haba
 Gan Eden
 Maaseh Breishit and Maaseh Merkavah
 Merkabah mysticism
 Four Worlds
 Jewish eschatology

References

Jewish folklore
Jewish mysticism
Merkabah mysticism
Entering heaven alive

he:פרדס (יהדות)